The Mercedes-Benz L 4500 was a heavy duty truck by Mercedes-Benz. It was built by Daimler-Benz from 1939 – 1944 in the Mercedes-Benz plant Gaggenau, and from 1944 – 1945 by Saurer. The vehicle is a long-bonnet truck and was offered as a rear-wheel-drive truck (L 4500 S) and as an all-wheel-drive truck (L 4500 A). The German Wehrmacht used the L 4500 with armoured cabins as Flaks during World War II. Due to the lack of production material, the cabin was replaced with the simplified standardised Wehrmacht cabin and the mudwings with simplified wings in 1943. Also, the L 4500 chassis was used for the Sonderkraftfahrzeug 4.

L4500 was also used as the designation until 1954 for the Mercedes-Benz L 312 built from 1953-1961.

Description 

The L 4500 is a truck with a long bonnet, U-shape ladder frame and two beam axles. Both axles are leaf sprung. The front axle has single wheels whereas the rear axle has twin wheels. The tyres have the size 10.5—20". A pneumo-hydraulic brake-system is used, each wheel has a drum brake, the parking brake locks the rear wheels only. For steering, a ZF Type 721 steering system is used. From the engine, the torque is transmitted to a manual five-speed gearbox with a single disc dry clutch. The gearbox has a reduction gear. Only the rear wheels are driven. Unlike the L 4500 S, the L 4500 A has an offroad gear, which automatically switches on the front-wheel-drive, and disables even torque distribution. The Mercedes-Benz OM 67/4 Diesel engine was installed in the L 4500. It is a six-cylinder, straight, four-stroke, precombustion-chamber-injected, water-cooled diesel engine with OHV-Valvetrain.

Bibliography 

 
Frank, Reinhard: Mercedes im Kriege – Personenwagen, Lastkraftwagen, Sonderaufbauten. Podzun-Pallas-Verlag, Dorheim. 1985. 
Ware, Pat: The Illustrated Guide to Military Vehicles: A complete reference guide to over 100 years of military vehicles. Anness Publishing – Hermes House. London. 2010. S. 143. 
Oswald, Werner: Kraftfahrzeuge der Reichswehr, Wehrmacht und Bundeswehr, Motorbuchverlag, Stuttgart 1970, p. 125

References 

Mercedes-Benz
World War II armoured fighting vehicles of Germany
L 4500
Military trucks of Germany